The Late Late Show with Craig Ferguson is an American late-night talk show that aired weeknights at 12:37 am. (Los Angeles time) on CBS in the United States from January 3, 2005, to December 19, 2014. The hour-long show was hosted by Scottish American comedian, actor and author Craig Ferguson, with his animatronic robot skeleton sidekick Geoff Peterson (voiced by Josh Robert Thompson), and featuring Secretariat, a pantomime horse. The shows writers and other staff appeared in skits and as themselves occasionally, with show producer Michael Naidus becoming a regular. 2,058 episodes were produced.

2005

2006

January

</table>

February

</table>

March

</table>

April

</table>

May

</table>

June

</table>

July

</table>

August

</table>

September

</table>

October

</table>

November

</table>

December

</table>

2007

January

</table>

February

</table>

March

</table>

April

</table>

May

</table>

June

</table>

July

</table>

August

</table>

September

</table>

October

</table>

November

</table>

There were no other episodes produced in November due to the 2007–08 Writers Guild of America strike.

December
There were no episodes produced in December due to the 2007–08 Writers Guild of America strike.

2008

January

</table>

February

</table>

March

</table>

April

</table>

May

</table>

June

</table>

July

</table>

August

</table>

September

</table>

October

</table>

November

</table>

December

</table>

2009

January

</table>

February

</table>

March

</table>

April

</table>

May

</table>

June

</table>

July

</table>

August

</table>

September

</table>

October

</table>

November

</table>

December

</table>

2010

January

</table>

February

</table>

March

</table>

April

</table>

May

June

July

August

September

October

</table>

November

December

2011

January

February

March

April

May

June

July

August

September

October

November

December

2012

January

February

March

April

May

June

July

August

September

</table>

October

</table>

November

</table>

December

</table>

2013

January 

</table>

February

</table>

March

</table>

April

</table>

May

</table>

June

</table>

July

</table>

August

</table>

September

</table>

October

</table>

November

</table>

December

</table>

2014

January

</table>

February

</table>

March

</table>

April

</table>

May

</table>

June

</table>

July

</table>

August

</table>

September

</table>

October

</table>

November

</table>

December

</table>

References

External links
 Craig Ferguson on Twitter
 

Episodes